Bronnikov is a Russian masculine surname, its feminine counterpart is Bronnikova. It may refer to
Fyodor Bronnikov (1827–1902), Russian-born history and genre painter
Yuliya Tarasenko (orienteer) (born Bronnikova in 1984), Russian ski orienteering competitor

Russian-language surnames